The deutoplasm comprises the food particles stored in the cytoplasm of an ovum or a cell, as distinguished from protoplasm, the yolk substance. Generally, the deutoplasm accumulates about the nucleus and is heavier than the surrounding cytoplasm. In chicken eggs, the cytoplasm and deutoplasm are separate.

References

Cell biology